National Port Authority Anchors is a club based in Monrovia Liberia. Their home Stadium is the Antonette Tubman Stadium.

Achievements
Liberian Premier League: 1
 1994

Liberian Cup: 2
 1992, 2006

Performance in CAF competitions
African Cup of Champions Clubs: 1 appearance
1995 – First Round

CAF Confederation Cup: 1 appearance
2007 – Preliminary Round

CAF Cup Winners' Cup: 1 appearance
1993 – disqualified in First Round

Current squad

Football clubs in Liberia
Sport in Monrovia